Mount Stephenson, is a  mountain in the Solitude Range of the Hart Ranges in Northern British Columbia.

The mountain is named for Canadian Army Corporal Harry Stephenson, from Kilkerran (north of Dawson Creek, BC).  Corporal Stephenson served with the 10 Field Squadron, Canadian Engineers with the 5th Canadian Armoured Division and was killed in action on 11 September 1944, along the Italian Gothic Line, age 31. He is buried at Gradara War Cemetery, Italy.

References 

Two-thousanders of British Columbia
Northern Interior of British Columbia
Canadian Army soldiers
Canadian Rockies
Peace River Land District